Daniel Köllerer was the defender of championship title, however lost to Federico del Bonis in the quarterfinals.
del Bonis won in the final 6–4, 6–3, against Florian Mayer.

Seeds

Draw

Finals

Top half

Bottom half

References
Qualifying Singles
Main Draw

Roma Open - Singles
2010 Singles